The Lakota Freedom Movement is a group of activists headed by leaders of the American Indian Movement, including activist and actor Russell Means. The group announced a plan on December 19, 2007 for the withdrawal of their treaty with the United States government. They have met with representatives of Bolivia, Venezuela, Chile and South Africa seeking recognition for their effort to form a free and independent Republic of Lakotah.

References

External links 
 Lakota Freedom Delegation
 Bolivia’s Morales Meets With North American Leaders

Sources 
 http://www.mahalo.com/Lakota_Freedom_Movement
 http://www.news.com.au/story/0,23599,22954249-1702,00.html
 https://web.archive.org/web/20071231093051/http://www.commondreams.org/news2007/1220-02.htm

Lakota
American Indian Movement
Independence movements
Separatism in the United States